Quintino Sella was the lead ship of her class of four destroyers built for the  (Royal Italian Navy) in the 1920s. Completed in 1926, she served in World War II.

Design and description
The Sella-class destroyers were enlarged and improved versions of the preceding   and es. Their complement was 8–9 officers and 144 enlisted men.

The Sellas were powered by two Parsons geared steam turbines, each driving one propeller shaft using steam supplied by three Thornycroft boilers.

Their main battery consisted of four  guns in one twin-gun turret aft of the superstructure and one single-gun turret forward of it. Anti-aircraft (AA) defense for the Sella-class ships was provided by a pair of  AA guns in single mounts amidships and a pair of  machine guns. They were equipped with four  torpedo tubes in two twin mounts amidships. The Sellas could also carry 32 mines.

Construction and career
Quintino Sella was laid down by Pattinson at their Naples shipyard on 12 October 1922, launched on 25 April 1925 and commissioned on 25 March 1926.

Citations

Bibliography

External links
 Quintino Sella Marina Militare website

Sella-class destroyers
Ships built in Italy
1925 ships
World War II destroyers of Italy
Maritime incidents in September 1943
World War II shipwrecks in the Mediterranean Sea